Magnetoplumbite is a iron- and lead based mineral. It is member of the magnetoplumbite group of minerals. Its type locality is Långban, Sweden

References

Lead minerals
Iron minerals
Manganese minerals
Minerals described in 1925